Éric Navet (born 9 May 1959) is a French equestrian and Olympic medalist. He was born in Bayeux. He won a bronze medal in show jumping at the 1992 Summer Olympics in Barcelona.

He was selected to represent France, in 1992 at the world championships in Stockholm with his young stallion of 8 years old Quito de Baussy, bred by his father at their Haras the Baussy farm in Normandy, and won there both the gold individual and team medals 

Navet lives in southern California, where he trains World Cup rider Karl Cook, and continues to compete at the national and FEI levels.

References

External links

1959 births
Living people
French male equestrians
Olympic equestrians of France
Olympic bronze medalists for France
Equestrians at the 1984 Summer Olympics
Equestrians at the 1992 Summer Olympics
Equestrians at the 2004 Summer Olympics
People from Bayeux
Olympic medalists in equestrian
Medalists at the 1992 Summer Olympics
Sportspeople from Calvados (department)